Ben Alexander (13 September 1971 – 21 June 1992) was an Australian rugby league footballer for the Penrith Panthers in the New South Wales Rugby League premiership. He was the younger brother of Australian Rugby League international Greg Alexander.

Football
Ben Alexander made his first grade debut in the 1990 season and was a non-playing reserve in the Panthers inaugural Grand Final winning team in 1991 (the Panthers were captained by his brother Greg).

Career playing statistics

Point scoring summary

Matches played

Death
On 21 June 1992, at the age of just 20, Alexander was killed in a car crash in Colyton, a suburb in western Sydney. It was later reported that his blood alcohol level was 0.148, almost three times the legal limit of 0.05. The tragic event occurred on a night that was meant to be one of celebration for the Panthers, as it was the night they had been presented with premiership blazers for their 1991 success.

Alexander's death had a profound effect on not only his family, but also the Penrith Panthers. While the Panthers form in their premiership defence was inconsistent prior to 21 June, the Panthers then failed to reach the 1992 Finals series, finishing in 9th place with an 11–11 record. For Ben's older brother, Greg, his death had a longer term effect. Greg missed most of the second half of the season, and endured (by his lofty standards) run of the mill 1993 and 1994 seasons. He then decided he needed time away from Sydney and joined a new club, the New Zealand-based Auckland Warriors for both 1995 and 1996, before returning to the Panthers for the inaugural Super League season in 1997. Ben and Greg's brother-in-law, Panthers international second-rower Mark Geyer (who is married to their sister), also decided he needed a change and left the Panthers after 1992 to join the Balmain Tigers in 1993.

References

External links
1991 Penrith Panthers season review

1971 births
1992 deaths
Alcohol-related deaths in Australia
Australian rugby league players
Penrith Panthers players
Road incident deaths in New South Wales
Rugby league halfbacks
Rugby league hookers
Rugby league players from Penrith, New South Wales